Archibald Napier, 1st Lord Napier, the 9th Laird Napier of Merchiston (c. 1576 – November 1645), was a Scottish politician and judge. In 1627 he was created Lord Napier of Merchiston and Baronet of Nova Scotia.

Biography
Archibald Napier was the son of John Napier and Elizabeth Stirling.

In 1619, he married Margaret Graham, who was a daughter of John Graham, 4th Earl of Montrose and Lady Margaret Ruthven, and sister of James Graham, 1st Marquess of Montrose. They had four children:
 John Napier, who died young.
 Archibald Napier, who succeeded his father as Lord Napier.
 Margaret Napier, who married Sir George Stirling of Keir.
 Lilias Napier, who died unmarried.

Offices and honors
Throughout his political career, he held many offices. Among these were:
 Gentleman of the Privy Chamber to King James VI. Napier accompanied him to London in 1603 to be crowned at Westminster Abbey.
 Treasurer-depute of Scotland from 1622 to 1631.
 Lord of Session in 1623.

In addition, he was one of the Bearers of the Canopy in the State Procession of 1633. He was raised to Baronet of Nova Scotia on 2 May 1627 and was knighted by King Charles I of England with the title Lord Napier of Merchiston on 5 May 1627.

Royalist
In 1640 he supported King Charles I against the Covenanters with his son, Archibald, the Master of Napier. Napier's son escaped, but Lord Napier and the rest of his family were imprisoned in Edinburgh Castle and fined £10,000. They were transferred to Linlithgow but Lord Napier's son Archibald managed to organise their escape. Both Lord Napier and his son joined the Marquess of Montrose (Lord Napier's brother-in-law) and fought with him at the Battle of Philiphaugh, though Lord Napier was over 70 years of age. Montrose and his followers lost at Philiphaugh and Montrose escaped to the Highlands with Lord Napier and his son. Lord Napier died at Fincastle, in Perthshire, in November 1645.

He wrote Memoirs of Archibald, First Lord Napier: Written by Himself as a defence against accusations of financial impropriety which were later judged to be false. The memoirs were later published in Edinburgh in 1793 by Francis, the 8th Lord Napier.

References

External links
 a painting of his wife, with some remarks by him

|-

Archibald
1570s births
1645 deaths
Treasurers-depute
Senators of the College of Justice
Lairds
Members of the Convention of the Estates of Scotland 1625
Peers of Scotland created by Charles I
Members of the Convention of the Estates of Scotland 1630
Members of the Parliament of Scotland 1639–1641
Lords of Parliament (pre-1707)
Lords Napier